Eagle Barnsdale is a village in the North Kesteven district of Lincolnshire, England. The population can be found included in the civil parish of Eagle and Swinethorpe. The village of Eagle is to the north, with Morton Hall to the south.

External links

Villages in Lincolnshire
North Kesteven District